The women's 800 metre freestyle competition of the swimming events at the 2015 Pan American Games took place on July 18 at the CIBC Pan Am/Parapan Am Aquatics Centre and Field House in Toronto, Canada. The defending Pan American Games champion was Kristel Kobrich of Chile.

This race consisted of sixteen lengths of the pool in freestyle. All participating swimmers would take part in 2 heats based on qualifying time. There were no finals.

Records
Prior to this competition, the existing world and Pan American Games records were as follows:

The following new records were set during this competition.

Qualification

Each National Olympic Committee (NOC) was able to enter up to two entrants providing they had met the A standard (8:52.99) in the qualifying period (January 1, 2014 to May 1, 2015). NOCs were also permitted to enter one athlete providing they had met the B standard (9:24.97) in the same qualifying period. All other competing athletes were entered as universality spots.

Schedule

All times are Eastern Time Zone (UTC-4).

Results

Final 
The finals were held on July 18.

References

Swimming at the 2015 Pan American Games
2015 in women's swimming